Stalk or stalking may refer to:

Behaviour
 Stalk, the stealthy approach (phase) of a predator towards its prey
 Stalking, an act of intrusive behaviour or unwanted attention towards a person
 Deer stalking, the pursuit of deer for sport

Biology
 Petiole (botany), a leaf stalk
 Peduncle (botany), a stalk of an inflorescence or a solitary flower
 Pedicel (botany), a stalk of a flower in an inflorescence
 Plant stem, one of two main structural axes of a vascular plant
 Pituitary stalk, a part of the brain

Other uses
 Stalk (sheaf), a mathematical construction
 The Stalk, a 1994 science fiction novel by Chris Morris and Janet Morris

See also
Stock (disambiguation)
Stork (disambiguation)